The 2009–10 Wisconsin Badgers women's basketball team represented the University of Wisconsin in the 2009–10 NCAA Division I women's basketball season. The Badgers, coached by Lisa Stone, finished tied for third in the Big Ten Conference. They received an at-large bid to the NCAA tournament, where they lost in the first round to Vermont.

Offseason
May 5: The Wisconsin women's basketball team will hit the road next year for the third annual Big Ten Conference/Atlantic Coast Conference Challenge. The Badgers travel to Raleigh, N.C., on Thursday, Dec. 3 to take on North Carolina State for just the second time in school history. Wisconsin is 1-1 all-time in the Big Ten/ACC Challenge.
July 28: Senior Teah Gant, junior Alana Trotter and sophomore Anya Covington have been named tri-captains of the University of Wisconsin women's basketball team for the upcoming season.

Regular season
Nov. 11: The Big Ten and Big 12 Conferences announced the formation of an annual inter-conference challenge for women's basketball. The challenge will span at least two years and will begin in the fall of 2010. The series will feature a home-and-home format over the initial two-year agreement, and each of the Big 12's teams will play in each Challenge, while one Big Ten team, Wisconsin, will play two Challenge games each year.
The Badgers will compete in the BTI Tip-Off Tournament from November 27 – 29.

Roster

Schedule

Player stats

Postseason

Big Ten tournament

NCAA basketball tournament

Awards and honors

Team players drafted into the WNBA

See also
2009–10 Big Ten women's basketball season
2009–10 NCAA Division I women's basketball season
2009–10 NCAA Division I women's basketball season
2009–10 Wisconsin Badgers women's ice hockey season

References

External links
Official Site

Wisconsin Badgers women's basketball seasons
Wisconsin
Wisconsin Badgers women's basketball
Wisconsin Badgers women's basketball
Wisconsin